Greenville Technical College is a public community college in Greenville, South Carolina. Founded in 1960, it began operation in September 1962.

Campuses
Greenville Tech currently has six locations in Greenville County:
Barton Campus (main location), in Greenville, South Carolina
Brashier Campus in Simpsonville, South Carolina
Donaldson Industrial Air Park (aircraft maintenance and truck driver training), at the former Donaldson Air Force Base
Benson Campus, in Greer, South Carolina
McKinney Auto Center (automotive technology), in Greenville, South Carolina
Northwest Campus, in Berea, South Carolina
Additional facilities are located at McAlister Square.

Notable alumni
Todd Kohlhepp, American serial killer

External links
Official website

Universities and colleges accredited by the Southern Association of Colleges and Schools
Education in Greenville County, South Carolina
Buildings and structures in Greenville, South Carolina
Education in Greenville, South Carolina
South Carolina Technical College System
Educational institutions established in 1960
1960 establishments in South Carolina